The National Spiritualist Association of Churches (NSAC)  is one of the oldest and largest of the national Spiritualist church organizations in the United States.  The NSAC was formed as the National Spiritualist Association of the United States of America (NSA) in September 1893, during a three-day convention in Chicago, Illinois.  Although American Spiritualists had previously tended to resist institutional or denominational organization, early NSA leaders hoped organization would help promote the truths of the religion both spiritually and practically.  Organization could help non-Spiritualists distinguish genuine mediumship from the rapidly proliferating varieties of fraudulent mediumship, increase communication among Spiritualists, prevent the legal prosecution of spirit mediums under fortune telling and medical licensing laws, and counterattacks by "orthodox" ministers in the press.  To these reasons, early leaders added the material support of spirit mediums and healers, just as other religious groups provided for the support of their clergy.

Among the NSA's first leaders were W. H. Bach, Harrison D. Barrett (former Unitarian clergymen), Luther V. Moulton, James Martin Peebles, and Cora L. V. Scott (spiritualist medium).  The association is also important for its adoption of a number of statements on spiritualism which have become a standard to which other Spiritualist bodies more or less adhere.

Declaration of Principles
In 1899, a six-article "Declaration of Principles" was adopted by many Spiritualist groups. Three other articles were added at a later date. By no means do all Spiritualist denominations or individual churches affirm these principles, but because of their historical significance in setting the beliefs of modern Spiritualism, all nine articles are quoted in full below. The influence of Unitarianism is obvious in the definition of God in principle one.

 We believe in Infinite Intelligence;
 We believe that the phenomena of Nature, both physical and spiritual, are the expression of Infinite Intelligence;
 We affirm that a correct understanding of such expression and living in accordance therewith constitute true religion;
 We affirm that the existence and personal identity of the individual continue after the change called death;
 We affirm that communication with the so-called dead is a fact, scientifically proven by the phenomena of Spiritualism;
 We believe that the highest morality is contained in the Golden Rule: "Do unto others as you would have them do unto you." (Principles 1-6 adopted in Chicago, Illinois, 1899. Principle 6 revised in Ronkonkorma, New York, 2004.)
 We affirm the moral responsibility of the individual, and that we make our own happiness or unhappiness as we obey or disobey Nature's physical and spiritual laws;
 We affirm that the doorway to reformation is never closed against any soul here or hereafter; (Principles 7-8 adopted in Rochester, New York, 1909 and revised in Rochester, New York, 2001.)
 We affirm that the precept of Prophecy and Healing are Divine attributes proven through Mediumship. (Principle 9 adopted in St. Louis, Missouri, 1944, revised in Oklahoma City, 1983 and in Westfield, New Jersey, 1998.)

Definitions

Over the years, other statements have been adopted on "What Spiritualism Is and Does" and "Spiritual Healing." A set of "Definitions" has also been approved. The two issues of "reincarnation" and the relation of Spiritualism to Christianity have been the major questions dividing Spiritualists. Differing answers to these two questions have split the NSAC on several occasions, and dissent led independent Spiritualists to form their own organizations instead of joining the NSAC. These were adopted in October 1914, 1919, 1930, 1950 during the organization's annual convention.  
 Spiritualism is the Science, Philosophy and Religion of continuous life, based upon the demonstrated fact of communication, by means of mediumship, with those who live in the Spirit World. (1919)
 Spiritualism Is a Science Because it investigates, analyzes and classifies facts and manifestations demonstrated from the spirit side of life.
 Spiritualism Is a Philosophy because it studies the Laws of Nature both on the seen and unseen sides of life and bases its conclusions upon present observed facts. It accepts statements of observed facts of past ages and conclusions drawn therefrom, when sustained by reason and by results of observed facts of the present day.
 Spiritualism Is a Religion because it strives to understand and to comply with the Physical, Mental and Spiritual Laws of Nature, which are the laws of God.
 A Spiritualist is one who believes, as the basis of his or her religion, in the communication between this and the Spirit World by means of mediumship and who endeavors to mould his or her character and conduct in accordance with the highest teachings derived from such communication. (1914, Rev. 1938)
 A Medium is one whose organism is sensitive to vibrations from the spirit world and through whose instrumentality, intelligences in that world are able to convey messages and produce the phenomena of Spiritualism. (1914)
 A Spiritualist Healer is one who, either through one's own inherent powers or through mediumship, is able to impart vital, curative force to pathologic conditions. (1930, 1993)
 The Phenomena of Spiritualism consists of Prophecy, Clairvoyance, Clairaudience, Gift of Tongues, Laying on of Hands, Healing, Visions, Trance, Apports, Levitation, Raps, Automatic and Independent Writings and Paintings, Voice, Materialization, Photography, Psychometry and any other manifestation proving the continuity of life as demonstrated through the Physical and Spiritual senses and faculties of man. (1950)

Reincarnation
Reincarnation, gaining popularity through theosophy, began to find favor among some mediums in the early twentieth century, but was specifically condemned by the NSAC in 1930. The concept of reincarnation has been more recently revisited, and the current policy (2008) is that it is not sufficiently established to include it as a position of the NSAC but further investigation is warranted. In practical terms, this means that reincarnation is not maintained as fact from the podium, but it can be addressed in unofficial gatherings.

Christianity
"Are Spiritualists also Christians?" was debated by the NSAC and generally decided in the negative. While the NSAC has drawn heavily on the Christian faith, from which most members came, it identifies its members as Spiritualists. The specifically "Christian Spiritualists" were found in other bodies such as the Progressive Spiritualist Church and the Spiritual Church Movement. Some Spiritualists differentiate between primitive Christianity, which they believe themselves to be following and practicing, and contemporary orthodox Christianity, which they strictly differentiate from both primitive Christianity and Spiritualism.

Structure

The polity of the association is hierarchical. There are loosely organized state associations and an annual national convention. Among Spiritualists, the association has the highest standards for ordination. The NSAC is noteworthy as the only Spiritualist body to attempt to develop work among youth. The lyceum was originally promoted and shaped by Andrew Jackson Davis in 1863. Children's materials have been developed and many churches have an active lyceum (Sunday school) program. Such efforts have given the NSAC a stability lacking in most Spiritualist bodies.

Membership

Membership: In 2002 the association reported 144 member congregations. There are ten state associations and 11 camps. There were also four affiliated congregations of the National Spiritualist Churches of Canada in Ontario and Quebec.

Facilities

The NSAC has two educational auxiliaries, the Morris Pratt Institute in Milwaukee, Wisconsin and The Center for Spiritualist Studies (CSS) in Lily Dale, New York.

Morris Pratt Institute was built in 1888 of a value assessed at $30,000 at that time. It was 48' wide and 85' long and contained two large auditorium halls, one of which seated nearly 400 people. It was designed by the founder Pratt as a temple and a school for Spiritualism.

At the Ninth Annual convention of the National Spiritualist Association of Churches (NSAC) held in Washington, D.C., Morris and Zulema Pratt presented a letter to the NSAC offering them the property to be utilized "for educational purposes." On November 2, 1901, he filed a petition for incorporation which resulted in the Morris Pratt Institute becoming a corporation managed by nine trustees, two of which were to be members of the National Spiritualist Association and one was to be the President of the Wisconsin State Spiritualist Association. Moses Hull was the President.

According to legend, it is said that a "Native American spirit guide" had told him of unknown mineral deposits the mining of which Morris Pratt made an investment in. It later became the profitable Ashland Mine of Ironwood, Michigan. Pratt made over $200,000 from his investment and used part of the monies for the benefit of the cause of Spiritualism. In 1889, the Temple was dedicated.

The Center for Spiritualist Studies (CSS) in Lily Dale, New York is located on the grounds of the NSAC-chartered Lily Dale Assembly, the world's largest Spiritualist camp. The CSS is incorporated as a religious seminary by the New York State Board of Regents. The goal of the curriculum is the training of Spiritualist Clergy, Teachers, Mediums and Healers.

The Hydesville Project
The Fox Property Project started in 1998 when the property was acquired by the NSAC and a memorial park was designed. This was home of the Fox family  and the property in which Modern Spiritualism began. The site of the Fox cottage in Hydesville, New York is thought to be a treasure for all Spiritualists and its restoration is supported by the descendants  of the Fox sisters, pioneers at the beginning of Modern American Spiritualism. The NSAC is involved in fund raising to restore the property and grounds in time for the 160th anniversary of the advent of Modern Spiritualism (in 2008).

Publications
The National Spiritualist Summit (TNS) is the official publication of the National Spiritualist Association of Churches.  It has been continuously published each month since 1919.
The Spotlight is a magazine, published 10 times a year, for Children of all ages produced by the National Spiritualist Association of Churches and maintains a continued emphasis on the progression of Spiritualism through teaching children.

See also
 List of Spiritualist organizations

Notes

References
 Barrett, H. D. Life Work of Cora L. V. Richmond. Chicago: Hack & Anderson, 1895.
 Holms, A. Campbell. The Fundamental Facts of Spiritualism. Indianapolis: Stow Memorial Foundation, n.d.
 Kuhnig, Verna Kathryn. Spiritualist Lyceum Manual. Milwaukee: National Spiritualist Association of Churches, 1962.
 One Hundredth Anniversary of Modern American Spiritualism. Chicago: National Spiritualist Association of Churches, 1948.

External links
 National Spiritualist Association of Churches
 Morris Pratt Institute

History of religion in the United States
Spiritualism in the United States
Religious organizations based in the United States
Spiritual organizations